The Amelia Island Museum of History is located at 233 South Third Street, Fernandina Beach, Florida.  It houses exhibits focusing on the history of Nassau County, Florida and is situated inside the old Nassau county jail. The building was added to the National Register of Historic Places on November 18, 2009.

Photos

Notes

External links
Amelia Island Museum of History (official website)
Amelia Island Museum of History. Information from Amelia Island Now On Line website.
Amelia Island Museum of History Fernandina Beach, Florida. Museum Info webpage from MuseumUSA.org.
 

History museums in Florida
Museums in Nassau County, Florida
Prison museums in Florida
Government buildings on the National Register of Historic Places in Florida
Streamline Moderne architecture in the United States
Government buildings completed in 1938
National Register of Historic Places in Nassau County, Florida
Fernandina Beach, Florida